In algebraic geometry, a complex manifold is called Fujiki class C if it is bimeromorphic to a compact Kähler manifold. This notion was defined by  Akira Fujiki.

Properties 

Let M be a compact manifold of Fujiki class C, and 
 its complex subvariety. Then X
is also in Fujiki class C (Lemma 4.6). Moreover, the Douady space of X (that is, the moduli of deformations of  a subvariety , M fixed) is compact and in Fujiki class C.

Fujiki class C manifolds are examples of compact complex manifolds which are not necessarily Kähler, but for which the -lemma holds.

Conjectures 

J.-P. Demailly and M. Pǎun have
shown that a manifold is in Fujiki class C if and only
if it supports a Kähler current. 
They also conjectured that a manifold M is in Fujiki class C if it admits a nef current which is big, that is, satisfies

For a cohomology class  which is rational, this statement is known: by Grauert-Riemenschneider conjecture, a holomorphic line bundle L with first Chern class

nef and big has maximal Kodaira dimension, hence the corresponding rational map to

is generically finite onto its image, which is algebraic, and therefore Kähler.

Fujiki and Ueno asked whether the property C is stable under deformations. This conjecture was disproven in 1992 by Y.-S. Poon and Claude LeBrun

References

Algebraic geometry
Complex manifolds